Ulu-Yelga (Oloyılğa) is a rural locality (a village) in Askinsky District, Bashkortostan, Russia. The population was 136 as of 2010. There are 3 streets.

Geography 
Ulu-Yelga is located 51 km north of Askino (the district's administrative centre) by road. Bazanchatovo is the nearest rural locality.

References 

Rural localities in Askinsky District